Smart Women is a 1983 novel by Judy Blume that tells the story of a divorcee who falls for her friend's ex-husband.

Plot summary
The story follows Margo and B.B., two divorcees who are trying to restart their lives in Boulder, Colorado, to the annoyance and amusement of their teenage daughters. Matters get much more complex and relationships strained when B.B.'s ex-husband moves next door to Margo and starts a relationship with her.

Characters
Margo Sampson - The main character and protagonist in the story. She is an architect. 
Francine Brady Broder (B.B.) - The antagonist in the story. She is a realtor.
Andrew Broder - B.B.'s ex husband, author and Margo's potential love interest.
Stuart Sampson- Margo's son. He is a high school senior.
Sara Broder - B.B.'s daughter. She turns 13-years-old  in the story.
Michelle Sampson - Margo's daughter. She is 17-years-old. Her character is vulnerable which makes her easy to love and understand. She gives her mother a very hard time because she cares about her and just wants her to be happy. She does not want any more disruptions in their lives.

Themes

The common theme in Smart Women is about divorce, change, love and a new start.

Symbols

The children represent Judy Blume's sensitivity toward their feelings. Both Sara and Michelle are mentioned throughout the whole book. She makes it clear they come first when it comes to Margo's and B.B's decision making. Both daughters provide the humor and poignancy in the story.

External links
Judy Blume's website

Bibliography

References

1983 American novels
Novels by Judy Blume
Novels set in Colorado